Partick is an interchange station in the Partick area of Glasgow, Scotland. Along with the adjacent bus station, it forms one of the main transport hubs in Glasgow. As of 2022, it is the fifth-busiest station in Scotland. The station is served by Glasgow Subway and ScotRail services and was one of the first to receive bilingual English and Gaelic signs, due to the significant Gaelic-speaking population in the surrounding Partick area.

History
The first station in the area was the North British Railway's , opened in 1887 slightly to the north of the existing site on the opposite side of the Dumbarton Road. Soon after, the Glasgow Subway opened and its Merkland Street station, slightly to the south of the existing station site, opened in December 1896.

Argyle Line opening
It stood a few hundred yards north of Merkland Street. The amalgamation of the two stations to a single site came in 1979, as a major refurbishment of the Glasgow Subway coincided with the Greater Glasgow Passenger Transport Executive's decision to reopen part of the Glasgow Central Railway, which had been axed by Beeching, as the Argyle Line and connecting it to the North Clyde system just east of Partick. Both stations were closed (Merkland Street had been since the Subway works began in May 1977, whilst Partickhill remained in service for several months after the Argyle Line opened, until replaced by the current Partick station) and replaced by British Rail with a new combined Partick station in the middle. The platforms at Partickhill are still visible from the North Clyde/Argyle Line, although access to Dumbarton Road is now blocked. The Merkland Street station buildings are no longer visible.

The station is one of the primary stations on the Argyle Line and North Clyde Line of the Glasgow suburban rail network. These lines primarily provide services to the east and west although the station itself is orientated north–south with two platforms. Statistically, it is the tenth busiest railway station in Scotland and the fifth busiest passenger interchange when subway and bus journeys from the site are included.

National Rail
Partick station is on a busy section of the Strathclyde rail network, served by all services on the Argyle Line and North Clyde Line.

Many journeys that interchange between the Argyle and North Clyde lines require passengers to change at Partick, as it is the closest station to central Glasgow with direct services to both  and  main line stations.

November 1979 (from opening of Argyle Line)
There were 15 trains per hour at opening of the Argyle Line in November 1979.
2 tph  to 
2 tph  to  via 
2 tph High Street to

2010/11 (From 12 December 2010)
There are a total of 14 trains per hour, off-peak, in each direction.

2016
The basic frequency still remains 14tph each way, but following a major timetable recast in December 2014 some routes have been changed. Springburn line services have now also been extended to Cumbernauld eastbound and Dumbarton Central westbound on weekdays, with an hourly service to Cumbernauld via Springburn starting/terminating here on Sundays.

Glasgow Subway

Partick subway station is one of the largest stations on the Glasgow Subway network, and has around 1.01 million boardings per year. This is due in part to its situation within the city and also the National Rail network. Partick is a relatively large population centre of Glasgow housing around 100,000 people, a significant number of whom use the subway to commute to the city centre.

Furthermore, Partick station is an interchange for two lines on the National Rail network. People commuting from outside Glasgow to one of the areas covered by the underground network may choose to continue their journey from Partick to allow for ease of transfer between the services and to avoid a lengthy walk between (for example) Glasgow Central and St Enoch.

It is one of only three with a dual side platform layout (the others being Govan and St Enoch). The rest have either a single central platform covering both circles or two platforms with a track running at the same side of each. The new Partick station replaced Merkland Street, which was located to the south, after modernisation. It should not be confused with the old Partick Cross station which is now known as Kelvinhall and is the next station clockwise from Partick.

It is the only station on the Subway that interchanges directly with a railway station, although Buchanan Street is linked to Queen Street by a length of moving walkway. St Enoch once shared this distinction, before its parent St Enoch railway station was closed in the 1960s and demolished in 1977.

Partick is one of three subway stations on the SPT Subway line to benefit from mobile telephone service nodes, the others being Buchanan Street and Hillhead. These nodes allow users of the O2 cellular network to use their mobile telephones while waiting on a subway train. The idea was to trial the technology at the busiest stations and, if successful, to put similar devices at each station eventually extending service across the entire network. As yet, the trial is incomplete.

The Partick subway station is not wheelchair accessible. The only two Glasgow Subway stations with wheelchair access are Govan and St Enoch, both of which feature a lift and escalator. Aside from Govan and St Enoch, Partick is the only Glasgow Subway station that includes an escalator.

Past passenger numbers 
 2011/12: 1.032 million annually

Bus station 
The bus station is situated above ground, adjacent to the National Rail platforms. It has six stances. It was closed from October 2017 to September 2018 for a £2.5 million refurbishment. Routes include the M4 Anniesland–Partick.

Modernisation

2005–2009 project

Strathclyde Passenger Transport began planning an extensive modernisation of the Partick station site – which had remained largely unchanged since its opening in 1979 – as early as 1998. Work began in late 2005 and was originally scheduled for completion in January 2007. However, delays to the project resulted in this date being put back on a number of occasions. The demolition and construction work was carried out while the site remained open to avoid any disruption in rail and underground services, arguably one of the most ambitious attributes of the project.

The total cost of the project was estimated to be around £12.3 million with professional fees and third-party costs accounting for £2.6 million of this. However, due to delays in the progression of the works and unforeseen difficulties – such as ground conditions on the land the station occupies, only discovered after the commencement of work – the company in charge of the development, C Spencer Construction, made a claim for a further £6.3 million.

In early 2009, the project finally reached its conclusion and on 31 March, the new station was officially opened to the public. The work done includes the construction of a completely new and modern station building which incorporates a brand new ticket office (which has been in use since 2008). Both railway platforms have been refurbished and now have their own indoor waiting rooms. Lifts linking the concourse to the National Rail platforms were installed.

2012–2013 project
The Subway platforms were renovated between summer 2012 and spring 2013 at a cost of £1.2 million. All floor, wall, and ceiling finishes were replaced with new contemporary designs. Improved lighting, signage, and facilities for disabled people were introduced.

Lifts linking the concourse to the Subway platforms were to be installed as part of this project because the necessary land is not owned by SPT. The future provision of lifts has, however, been safeguarded.

References

Notes

Sources

 
 
 
 Location of Partick station on navigable OS map

External links
Video footage of Partick Station

Railway stations in Glasgow
Railway stations opened by British Rail
Railway stations in Great Britain opened in 1979
SPT railway stations
Railway stations served by ScotRail
Partick
Glasgow Subway stations
Railway stations located underground in the United Kingdom